Konio may refer to:

 Konio, Mopti, Mali, a village
 Konio Heagi (born 1973), Papua New Guinean cricketer
 Konio Oala (born 1996), Papua New Guinean cricketer